Emil Joseph "Buzzie" Bavasi (December 12, 1914 – May 1, 2008) was an American executive in Major League Baseball who played a major role in the operation of three franchises from the late 1940s through the mid-1980s.

He was best known as the general manager of the Brooklyn and Los Angeles Dodgers from 1951 to 1968, during which time the team captured eight National League pennants and its first four World Series titles. He was previously a key figure in the integration of minor league baseball in the late 1940s while working for the Dodgers organization. He went on to become the first president of the San Diego Padres (1968–77); then, between 1977 and 1984, as general manager, he assembled the California Angels teams that made the franchise's first two postseason appearances. His sons Peter Bavasi and Bill Bavasi have also served as big league general managers.

Early life
He was born Emil Joseph Bavasi in Manhattan, New York City. His sister, Iola ("Lolly"), nicknamed him Buzzie because his mother said he was "always buzzing around." Bavasi was raised in Scarsdale, New York by Joseph and Sue Bavasi. Joseph, his immigrant father, was a newspaper distributor.

He went to high school at Fordham Preparatory School, in the Bronx, with Fred Frick, the son of Ford Frick, president of the National League.

He attended DePauw University, in Greencastle, Indiana, where he was a catcher and while at DePauw roomed with Fred Frick, after which Ford Frick recommended Bavasi for an office boy position with the Dodgers to Larry MacPhail. Bavasi graduated from DePauw in 1938.

Bavasi was hired by Dodgers general manager Larry MacPhail in 1938, for $35 a week, to become a front office assistant with the Brooklyn Dodgers, and after one year was named the business manager of the Dodgers' Class D minor league team in Americus, Georgia, where he spent three seasons. In 1941 he moved to Durham, North Carolina Class B team of the Dodgers and married his wife, Evit.

After being drafted, he was awarded a Bronze Star Medal fighting in the Italian Campaign of World War II as a machine-gunner in the United States Army.

In late 1945, after serving 18 months, Staff Sergeant Bavasi returned to Georgia to rest with his family.  While there, Dodgers president Branch Rickey telephoned and asked Bavasi to become business manager of a new minor-league baseball team in the New England League, and to find a suitable city in which to place the club.

Integration: Nashua and "Dodgertown"
Although Bavasi did not know for certain, he suspected that Rickey, who had started to integrate the Dodgers' farm system with the signing of Jackie Robinson the previous October, might be planning to sign more African Americans to contracts. If that was the case, the Dodgers needed a low-level minor-league team outside the American South to which to assign these players. Ultimately, Bavasi chose Nashua, New Hampshire. With fewer than 35,000 people, Nashua would be the smallest market in the New England League, and fewer than fifty African Americans resided in the community. However, the Nashua Dodgers were assured of a predominantly French Canadian fan base, a fact which both Rickey and Bavasi believed would help in the integration of African Americans into minor league baseball. Additionally, Nashua was home to the relatively new Holman Stadium, which Bavasi was able to lease from the city.

In March 1946, Bavasi received word that Brooklyn had signed former Negro league ballplayers Roy Campanella and Don Newcombe, and that they would be sent to Nashua for the season. Bavasi spent nearly a month planning for their arrival, naming Nashua Telegraph publisher Fred Dobens to the position of President of the Nashua Dodgers to ensure the newspaper's support for the integration project; Dobens's newspaper did not release any word of the signings until April. Bavasi also publicly linked the team to Clyde Sukeforth, who had scouted Campanella, Newcombe, and Jackie Robinson for Rickey and who had played minor-league baseball in Nashua in the mid-1920s. He promoted the team's French Canadian connection through his team's Quebec-born players, and even attempted to hire Frenchy Bordagaray to manage the team (eventually he settled on Walter Alston).

The 1946 season was a successful one. The Nashua Dodgers placed second in the league and won the Governor's Cup, defeating the Lynn Red Sox. In terms of attendance, Nashua also proved successful, in part because of Bavasi's imaginative promotional skills. The league saw few racially motivated incidents, with two exceptions. Campanella has claimed that Manchester Giants catcher Sal Yvars threw dirt in his face during a game at Manchester Athletic Field (Gill Stadium), but the incident was resolved on the field (though Yvars has denied that the incident took place). More seriously, players and the manager of the Lynn Red Sox hurled racial slurs and insults at Campanella and Newcombe, particularly late in the season when the two clubs were locked in a tight pennant race. On one occasion, Bavasi was so enraged by the comments of the Red Sox that he met Lynn's manager and players in the Holman Stadium parking lot and challenged them to a fight. Players restrained Bavasi and the Lynn manager, and the Lynn team boarded their bus without further incident.

As a result of their success in Nashua, Bavasi, Campanella, and Alston all were promoted to teams in higher-level leagues in 1947, and Newcombe followed in 1948.

In 1948, Bavasi became general manager of the Montreal Royals, one of the Dodgers' top two Triple-A farm teams. Around that time, as a result of continued prejudice against Brooklyn's African American ballplayers during spring training, the Dodgers sent Bavasi to find property at which to establish a permanent spring training facility. Bavasi chose a site outside Vero Beach, Florida, at which to establish Dodgertown, anchored by the newly constructed Holman Stadium. The Dodgers continued to train there virtually without interruption through 2008 before moving to a new facility in Glendale, Arizona.

MLB executive career

Dodgers
During Bavasi's term in Montreal, disagreements over the operation of the parent team in Brooklyn intensified between Rickey and Walter O'Malley; at the time, Rickey and O'Malley were two of four equal partners in the Dodgers, each holding 25 percent of the club's stock. In 1950, the illness and death of another partner, pharmaceutical executive John L. Smith, coincided with the pending expiration of Rickey's contract as the Dodgers' president and general manager. With Smith and, later, his widow both siding with O'Malley, Rickey's contract was not renewed. O'Malley then acquired Rickey's stock to assume 50 percent ownership, took over as team president, and named Bavasi (then 35 years old) the Dodgers' vice president and de facto general manager on November 3, 1950. O'Malley would acquire Mary Louise Smith's 25 percent share in 1958, then become sole owner in 1975 when he bought out the heirs of Dearie Mulvey's one-quarter stake in the team. Bavasi would be given the formal title of executive vice president and general manager prior to the 1958 season.

In Bavasi's nearly 18 years as the team's top baseball operations executive, the Dodgers won eight National League pennants (and )—including the first four World Series titles in franchise history (1955, 1959, 1963 and 1965). Three world championships occurred after the team's move to Los Angeles in 1958, a move that Bavasi did not favor. The Dodgers also finished in a dead heat twice with the Giants, necessitating tie-breaking, best-of-three series in both 1951 and 1962. But they dropped the clinching playoff games in the ninth innings of each contest.

While the nucleus of the Brooklyn-based team was in place when Bavasi took over in 1951, he and O'Malley remained committed to the Dodgers' extensive scouting and player development system that Rickey had constructed after the war. That system contributed players such as Joe Black, Jim Gilliam, Johnny Podres and Sandy Amoros (heroes of the 1955 World Series), Roger Craig, Don Drysdale, Sandy Koufax, Charlie Neal and Don Zimmer to the Dodgers before their move to California. In the late 1950s, it produced Larry Sherry, a relief pitcher who was key to the 1959 pennant and World Series title. It also began to churn out the core regulars of the Dodgers' 1960s dynasty, such as Tommy Davis, Willie Davis, Ron Fairly, Frank Howard, John Roseboro and Maury Wills. During the mid-1960s, the Dodgers developed Jim Lefebvre, Wes Parker and Don Sutton, all key contributors to their 1965–66 pennants. Bavasi also made strategic additions of veteran players who proved pivotal to pennant-winning teams, like Sal Maglie (1956), Wally Moon (1959), Bill Skowron (1963), Claude Osteen (1965–66, after he was acquired for Howard), Lou Johnson (1965–66) and Phil Regan (1966). In 1960, he acquired (in a trade for Zimmer) a minor-league left-handed relief pitcher from the Chicago Cubs, Ron Perranoski, who would anchor the Dodgers' bullpen through 1967.

Bavasi also strongly recommended Walter Alston to O'Malley as a potential Brooklyn manager after the 1953 season. Alston, then a career minor leaguer, had managed for Bavasi in Nashua (1946) and Montreal (1950). O'Malley would hire Alston and sign him to 23 consecutive one-year contracts, with Alston winning seven National League pennants and four World Series titles while forging a place in the Baseball Hall of Fame.

In the days surrounding Bavasi's June 1968 departure from the Dodgers, the club enjoyed what has been called the best amateur draft in baseball history. The regular and secondary phases of the 1968 June lottery, supervised by Fresco Thompson and Al Campanis, the team's top minor league and scouting officials who would be Bavasi's immediate successors as GM, netted Steve Garvey, Davey Lopes, Ron Cey, Bill Buckner, Bobby Valentine, Joe Ferguson, Doyle Alexander and others.

After the Dodgers won the 1959 Series in only their second year in Los Angeles, The Sporting News named Bavasi the Major League Executive of the Year.

Padres
Bavasi selected Dodger third-base coach Preston Gómez as the Padres' first manager and added former Dodgers (or Dodger farmhands) Craig, Moon and Sparky Anderson as coaches for their maiden season. While the pickings in the National League expansion draft were slim, Bavasi managed to select slugger Nate Colbert and hard-hitting outfielders Ollie Brown and Cito Gaston, who provided punch to the Padre lineup during the team's early history.

As was typical for expansion teams before free agency, the Padres struggled on the field. They finished last in the National League West Division for their first six years of existence and lost over 100 games four times (and 99 games once); the team's high-water mark during Bavasi's nine-year term as club president was 73 wins. Poor attendance forced majority owner C. Arnholdt Smith to put the Padres up for sale in 1973 and almost drove them to transfer to Washington, D.C.  But fast-food magnate Ray Kroc stepped in and saved the Padres for San Diego, and attendance perked up beginning in 1974, Kroc's first season as owner.

Although veteran minor league executive Eddie Leishman held the title of general manager during the team's early seasons, Bavasi was integrally involved in baseball decisions. After the 1972 season, he promoted his son Peter from farm system director to GM, and the younger Bavasi drafted future Hall of Famer Dave Winfield with the club's first-round pick in the 1973 Major League Baseball Draft.  Peter left the Padres after the 1976 campaign to become the first president in the history of the expansion Toronto Blue Jays, and in 1977, the Bavasis became the first father-and-son duo to serve as chief executives of two different MLB teams at the same time.

Angels
After the 1977 season, California Angels owner Gene Autry hired the elder Bavasi as executive vice president and general manager. But each time the Angels failed to advance to the World Series, dropping the 1979 American League Championship Series to the Baltimore Orioles and the 1982 ALCS to the Milwaukee Brewers.

Through trades, free agency and the club's farm system, Bavasi acquired players such as Rod Carew, Reggie Jackson, Carney Lansford, Bob Boone, Fred Lynn, Mike Witt and Don Aase. But there were setbacks: the shocking death of star free agent outfielder Lyman Bostock, who was murdered late during the 1978 season in a case of mistaken identity, and the failure to retain future all-time strikeout king Nolan Ryan when he became a free agent after the 1979 campaign. Nearing age 70, Bavasi retired during the closing days of the 1984 season, when the Angels finished at the .500 mark.

Personal life
Bavasi's son Bill is the former general manager of the Seattle Mariners and California Angels; son Peter held president or general manager positions with the Padres, Blue Jays and Cleveland Indians during the 1970s and 1980s; and another son, Chris, formerly served as mayor of Flagstaff, Arizona. With his wife, Evit, they had a fourth son, Bob, the former owner of the Everett AquaSox.

Bavasi was inducted into the San Diego Padres Hall of Fame in 2001. In 2007, he was also inducted by the San Diego Hall of Champions into the Breitbard Hall of Fame honoring San Diego's finest athletes both on and off the playing surface.

Actor Wally Cassell played Buzzie (Dodgers manager) in season 1, episode 29 of The Beverly Hillbillies, titled The Clampetts & the Dodgers.

Bavasi died on May 1, 2008, in San Diego, California, near his home in La Jolla, aged 93.

References

Bavasi, Buzzie. (1987). Off the Record.  Contemporary Books.
Campanella, Roy. (1959). It's Good to Be Alive.  New York:  Little Brown and Co.
Daly, Steve. (2002).  Dem Little Bums:  The Nashua Dodgers. Concord, New Hampshire:  Plaidswede Publishing.
Pietrusza, David, Matthew Silverman & Michael Gershman, ed. (2000). Baseball: The Biographical Encyclopedia. Total/Sports Illustrated.
Roper, Scott C., and Stephanie Abbot Roper. (1998).  "'We're Going to Give All We Have for this Grand Little Town': Baseball Integration and the 1946 Nashua Dodgers."  Historical New Hampshire 53:1/2 (Spring/Summer) pp. 3–19.
Tygiel, Jules. (1997).  Baseball's Great Experiment: Jackie Robinson and his Legacy.  New York:  Oxford University Press.

External links
Baseball Hall of Fame - 2008 Veterans Committee candidate profile

A "Chat" with Buzzie Bavasi – San Diego chapter of SABR
December 2004 interview, San Diego Union-Tribune
Baseball Library
Photo, with Walter O'Malley

1914 births
2008 deaths
Brooklyn Dodgers executives
California Angels executives
DePauw University alumni
Los Angeles Dodgers executives
Major League Baseball executives
Major League Baseball general managers
Major League Baseball team presidents
People from La Jolla, San Diego
People from Scarsdale, New York
San Diego Padres executives
United States Army personnel of World War II
United States Army soldiers
Fordham Preparatory School alumni